Yakov Lazarevich Geronimus, sometimes spelled J. Geronimus (February 6, 1898, Rostov – July 17, 1984, Kharkov) was a Russian mathematician known for contributions to theoretical mechanics and the study of orthogonal polynomials. The Geronimus polynomials are named after him.

References

Geronimus, Yakov Lazarevich (1898–1984)

National University of Kharkiv alumni
Russian mathematicians
Mathematical analysts